The 1994–95 All-Ireland Senior Club Hurling Championship was the 25th staging of the All-Ireland Senior Club Hurling Championship, the Gaelic Athletic Association's premier inter-county club hurling tournament. The championship began on 14 August 1994 and ended on 17 March 1995.

Sarsfields were the defending champions, however, they failed to qualify for the championship. Naas of Kildare, St. Dominic's of Roscommon, Tullaroan of Kilkenny and Oulart-the Ballagh of Wexford made their first appearances in the championship.

On 2 April 1995, Birr won the championship following a 3-13 to 2-03 defeat of Dunloy in a replay of the All-Ireland final. This was the first All-Ireland title.

Paddy Kelly of Kilmallock was the championship's top scorer with 1-26.

Team summaries

Results

Connacht Senior Club Hurling Championship

First round

Quarter-final

Semi-final

Final

Leinster Senior Club Hurling Championship

Preliminary round

First round

Quarter-finals

Semi-finals

Finals

Munster Senior Club Hurling Championship

Quarter-finals

Semi-finals

Final

Ulster Senior Club Hurling Championship

Semi-finals

Final

All-Ireland Senior Club Hurling Championship

Quarter-final

Semi-finals

Finals

Championship statistics

Top scorers

Top scorers overall

Top scorers in a single game

References

1994 in hurling
1995 in hurling
All-Ireland Senior Club Hurling Championship